Ringgold High School may refer to:

Ringgold High School (Georgia) in Ringgold, Georgia
Ringgold High School (Louisiana) in Ringgold, Louisiana
Ringgold High School (Pennsylvania) in Monongahela, Pennsylvania